Cyrtomostoma is a genus of picture-winged flies in the family Ulidiidae.

Species
 C. gigas

References

Ulidiidae